The Solent Amphibious Challenge is a day-long multi-discipline adventure race over land and sea, held every year in the Solent. The aim of the race is to test the competitor's leadership and navigation and seamanship in a physically demanding combined challenge.  The Solent Amphibious Challenge is believed to be the first sea-land style adventure race of its kind, and the race is only open to teams from the British Armed Forces. The teams consist of five personnel; a yachtmaster qualified team leader who must know well the International Regulations for Preventing Collisions at Sea and Local Notices to Mariners, two crew members (one competent crew-qualified), a runner and a support cyclist.

Description
The one-day multi-event race over land and sea is held in June of every year under the authority of Commodore HMS Collingwood and involves a maximum of 6 five-person teams. Created by Commander Duncan Forer of the Royal Navy, an active adventurer and sailor, the first race was run on 27 June 2012. It is the only adventure race worldwide that has been granted an official partnership by the British Armed Forces.

The race starts with all yachts crossing the start line at Gillkicker Point with all members on board at 9 a.m. (BST).  Boats then sail west to Yarmouth Marina where the designated runner and support cyclist will land and begin a run along a prescribed route of approximately 25 miles from west to east to Bembridge Harbour at the other end of the island.  The runner is entirely supported by a cyclist and the runner must not swap with the cyclist. The remaining sailing team then sail as quickly as possible to Bembridge, where they will rendezvous with the running team who will both then re-board the yacht. If the runner fails to reach Bembridge by 7 p.m. then the whole team are retired from the race (due to the tidal window).  The boat and whole team then sail to meet the finish line at Gillkicker, which is the same as the earlier start line.

See also 

 Solent
 Isle of Wight
 Adventure racing
 Patagonian Expedition Race
 Eco-Challenge

References

External links
Word Press SAC Race format as per 2012
Royal Navy Event Calendar
Strudyna Solent Amphibious Challenge Trophy Unveiled June 21 2012

2012 in British sport
Adventure racing
Multisports in the United Kingdom
Sailing in England